The fourth legislative assembly election of Madras State (later renamed as Tamil Nadu) was held in February 1967. The Dravida Munnetra Kazhagam (DMK) led coalition under the leadership of C.N. Annadurai won the election defeating the Indian National Congress (Congress). Anti-Hindi agitations, the rising prices of essential commodities, and a shortage of rice were the dominant issues. K. Kamaraj's resignation as the Chief Minister in 1963, to concentrate on party affairs, along with persistent rumors of corruption had weakened the incumbent Congress Government. This was the second time after Communist Party of India winning Kerala assembly elections in 1957, for a non-Congress party to gain the majority in a state in India, and the last time that Congress held power in Tamil Nadu. It was the first time a party or pre-election alliance formed a non-Congress government with an absolute majority.  It marked the beginning of Dravidian dominance in the politics of Tamil Nadu. Annadurai, who became the first non-Congress chief minister of post-independence Tamil Nadu, died in office in 1969 and V.R. Nedunchezhiyan took over as acting chief minister.

Background 
The Congress party began to show weakness in the years after the 1962 election. In the summer of 1962, DMK conducted demonstrations against rising prices. These demonstrations turned violent throughout the state leading to the arrest of 6500 DMK volunteers, 14 members of the assembly and four members of the Lok Sabha, including Annadurai.

Kamaraj resigned the Chief Ministership in 1963 to assume the presidency of the All India Congress Committee and was replaced by M. Bakthavatsalam. Robert L. Hardgrave, Jr. (Temple Professor Emeritus in the Humanities, Government and Asian Studies from the University of Texas) wrote in an article published in the journal Pacific Affairs, that M. Bhaktavatsalam did not have the personal charisma or political acumen of Kamaraj. Persistent rumours of corruption tarnished the image of the Government. In October 1964, the food crisis brought the popularity of the Congress Government to an all-time low.

Issues 

The major issues at play in the election were the official language issue, the rise in essential commodity prices and the shortage of rice. The central Government led by the Indian National Congress had implemented an act replacing English with Hindi as an official language of India while retaining a possible "associate" status to English. The switchover came into effect on 26 January 1965. In protest to the vague wording of the act, fearing a possible elimination of English and imposition of Hindi, DMK had launched an agitation opposing the switchover and that agitation turned violent. The 1967 election was held in the aftermath of this violence.

The acute rice shortage prevailing in the state became an election issue with the DMK promising to supply three padis (approx. 4.5 kg) of rice for 1 Rupee in its election manifesto. The DMK capitalised on the rice shortage as well as widespread discontent with the Bhaktavatsalam administration. Slogans like Kamarajar Annachi kadalaiparuppu vilai ennachu (Elder Brother (Annachi is a title historically been used to refer to a person of Kamaraj's caste) Kamaraj, what happened to the price of chana dal?), Bhaktavatsalam annachi arisi vilai ennachu (lit. Brother Bhatavatsalam, what happened to the price of rice?) were used effectively by the DMK to stir public anger against the Congress.

This election was noted for popular actor, DMK candidate and future Chief Minister M.G. Ramachandran (MGR) being shot in the throat by actor M.R. Radha. He survived the shooting, but the incident created a huge popularity wave for MGR. This eventually helped to increase the popularity of not only MGR, but also the DMK in the election, and is attributed as one of the reasons for the victory of the DMK.

Coalitions 
There were two major political coalitions running in the elections. The Indian National Congress contested alone, while the Dravidar Kazhagam (DK) under Periyar E. V. Ramasamy supported and campaigned for the incumbent Congress against his protege Annadurai. The DMK-led front comprised the Swatantra Party, Communist Party of India (Marxist), Praja Socialist Party, Samyukta Socialist Party, Tamil Nadu Toilers Party, Republican Party of India and the Indian Union Muslim League. The Tamil Arasu Kazhagam and the We Tamils party campaigned using the DMK election symbol. This opposition coalition was forged by C. Rajagopalachari (Rajaji) with the sole purpose of defeating the Kamaraj led Congress. Rajaji's personal hostility to Kamaraj and his opposition to the Congress party were the main reasons behind Swatantra's alliance with DMK. The Communist Party of India campaigned alone without joining either of the two coalitions.

The electoral alliance between DMK, Swatantra Party and Muslim League had emerged in the years before the 1964 civic elections throughout Madras state. During the 1964 election campaign Rajagopalachari had said, "The DMK and Muslim League are my children and I am duty bound to nurse them to strength and stature."

Campaigning 

Both Congress and DMK used films and actors for campaigning. Gemini Studios produced a political film for the Congress – Vazhga Nam Thayagam starring Shivaji Ganesan and Nagesh. Sivaji and Padmini worked for the Congress party. Despite its efforts, Congress could not counter the DMK's propaganda, which had a long history of using films for political campaigns since its founding.

DMK's long-term association with the Tamil Film industry was put to good use in the campaign. MGR's films were used to attack Congress policies and to popularise DMK's positions. Similar to the tactics employed in the elections of 1957 and 1962, film songs and dialogues from Kaanji Thalaivan (1963), "Deivathai (1964),  "Padakotti (1964)", Aayirathil Oruvan", Enga Veettu Pillai (1965), Anbe Vaa (1966),  Naan Aanaiyittal (1966), "Mugarasi (1966)", "Petralthan Pillaya (1966)",Vivasayee (1967) and Arasakattalai (1967) were used for political messaging. Lesser known film stars like Ravichandran and Jaishankar used their films for praising DMK and Annadurai. The DMK put up posters of MGR recuperating in a hospital bed with a neck cast (from his gunshot wounds) all over Tamil Nadu to garner public sympathy and support.

Election 
The election was held for a total of 234 constituencies, including 43 Scheduled Caste and 2 Scheduled Tribe reserved constituencies. 778 candidates, including 11 women were in the fray, of whom 231 men and 3 women were elected to the assembly. The election saw a turnout of 76.57 percent of all eligible voters, with 79.19% men and 73.99% women casting their votes. The polling for the assembly election took place along with the polling for the 1967 parliamentary elections. It took place in three phases between 5 and 21 February (5, 18 and 21 February).

Results
DMK and its coalition allies won 179 seats (76.5%). The Indian National Congress won 51 seats (21.8%). Four candidates of the Naam Thamizhar Party led by S. P. Adithanar and two candidates of Tamil Arasu Kazhagam led by M. P. Sivagnanam contested under DMK's "Rising Sun" Symbol. The Indian Union Muslim League candidates contested as independents.

By constituency

Analysis
The effective grass roots campaigning by the DMK and the political acumen of Annadurai, defeated the Congress and its leader M. Bhaktavatsalam. The popularity of the United Front was so large that they were able to win an absolute majority in ten out of the 14 districts in the state, while Congress could not accomplish that in a single district. This was largely due to the fact that the United Front was able to capitalize on its growing support in large towns and cities, combined with the decline in Congress support in its traditional Schedule Caste constituencies.

Margin of Victory
The following table shows the number of seats won by corresponding parties, by the margin of votes.

Notable losses 
The former chief minister and popular leader of the Indian National Congress, K. Kamaraj lost his seat in Virudunagar by 1285 votes to the student leader P. Seenivasan from the DMK. A few days before the election, Kamaraj had an accident and could not campaign. This led to his famous declaration that he would win lying down. He lost the election along with the incumbent Chief Minister M. Bakthavatsalam, who lost his seat in Sriperumbudur to D. Rajarathinam from the DMK by 8926 votes. Except for G. Bhuvaraghan (the minister for Information and Publicity), all ministers of the outgoing Bakthavatsalam cabinet were defeated in this election.

There was a post-result wall-painting in Virudhunagar by DMK which said "படிக்காத காமராஜரை படித்த இளைஞன் சீனிவாசன் தோற்கடித்தார்!" ( The illiterate Kamaraj was defeated by Graduate Youth Sreenivasan!). The Congress replied with "படிக்காத முதல்வர் காமராஜர் அன்று கட்டிய அரசு கல்விக்கூடங்களில் படித்து பட்டம் வாங்கிய இளைஞன் சீனிவாசன், இப்போது அதே காமராஜரை தோற்கடித்தான்"  ( The Seenivasan who studied and graduated in Education Institutes built under orders of then Chief Minister of Tamil Nadu illiterate Kamaraj, has now defeated the same Kamaraj)

Government formation 
The election results were announced on 23 February 1967 and the DMK won an absolute majority on its own. It had increased its vote share to 40.6% from 27.1% in 1962 election. Annadurai resigned as the Member of Parliament from the Rajya sabha. Annadurai was nominated as Chief Minister of Madras State and staked a claim to form a Government on 2 March 1967. He was sworn in by Governor Ujjal Singh on 6 March 1967 in Rajaji Hall. He was later elected to the Madras Legislative Council on 22 April 1967.

Annadurai's Cabinet 
The council of ministers in C. N. Annadurai's cabinet (6 March 1967 – 10 February 1969) were all from the DMK and they are listed in the following table.

See also 
 Indian general election in Madras, 1967
 Elections in Tamil Nadu
 Legislature of Tamil Nadu
 Government of Tamil Nadu

References

External links

State Assembly elections in Tamil Nadu
Madras